Karbi Anglong Autonomous Council (KAAC) is an autonomous district council in the state of Assam, India for development and protection of tribals living in area namely  Karbi Anglong and West Karbi Anglong district. The council is constituted under the Sixth Schedule of the Constitution of India and administratively functions under the Government of Assam. It was formed with the name Karbi Anglong District Council on 17 November 1951. Later changed to Karbi Anglong Autonomous Council on 23 June 1952, which is now celebrated as its foundation day. After Signing of M.O.U. between Government of India, Government of Assam and United People's Democratic Solidarity, it was renamed to Karbi Anglong Autonomous Territorial Council. It has administrative functions over two district, Karbi Anglong district and West Karbi Anglong district. Its headquarters is in Diphu, Karbi Anglong district. The total area of the Karbi Anglong  Autonomous Council is 10,434 sq. km having a population of 961,275 as of 2011.

History
The Government of India passed a bill in Lok Sabha in the year 1951 and Sri. Rajendra Prasad, His Excellency the President of India assented to the creation of United Mikir and North Cachar Hills District. The district of United Mikir and North Cachar Hills district was bifurcated into two separate districts under banner as "Mikir Hills" and North Cachar Hills district in the year 1970. The Mikir Hill district was again rechristened as "Karbi Anglong District" w.e.f. 14 October 1976 vide Govt. Notification No. TAD/R/115/74/47 Dtd. 14-10-1976. Thus Karbi Anglong came into being as a full fledged separate district in the map of Assam with its Head quarter at Diphu. 

On 1 April 1996 the Karbi Anglong District Council was renamed as the Karbi Anglong Autonomous Council [KAAC] by an Act of Parliament by incorporating into the Sixth Schedule in the Constitution (Amendment) Act, 1995 (42 of 1995) of the Constitution of India granting greater autonomy to the Council vide Govt. Notification No. HAD.57/95/63-64, dtd. 29.06.1995, and entrusted 30 (thirty) more department to Karbi Anglong Autonomous Council along with other sponsored schemes for the welfare of indigenous people. Further, a tripartite Memorandum of Settlement (MoS) was signed between the Central Government, Government of Assam and United People's Democratic Solidarity (UPDS) in the presence of Union Home Minister Shri P. Chidambaram and Assam Chief Minister Shri Tarun Gogoi in accordance with which the Karbi Anglong Autonomous Council will be re-christened as KARBI ANGLONG AUTONOMOUS TERRITORIAL COUNCIL.

On 15 August 2015, the district was further bifurcated into two districts, namely Karbi Anglong and West Karbi Anglong Districts. As such the purview of the present Karbi Anglong Autonomous Council (KAAC) has jurisdiction over two full fledged districts.

Structure

Executive branch
Heading the Executive Wing of the ADC is the Executive Committee whose duties are similar to those of the Cabinet of the State. The head of the Executive Committee, that is, the Chief Executive Member is elected by majority votes by the Council in Session and such election is to be approved by the Governor of the State. The Chief Executive Member then nominates Members of the Executive Committee from amongst the members of the Council. The Executive Committee remains in Office as long as they enjoy the majority support of Members of the Council.

List of Chief Executive Members
 Khorsing Terang, 23-06-1952 to 28-11-1955
 Dr. Jayanta Rongpi, 25-01-1989 to 20-06-1996
 Sri Sum Ronghang, 03-06-2006 to 21-12-2006
 Sri Tuliram Ronghang, 17-10-2013 to present

Legislative branch

The members of the Council hold regular session once every four months. The Annual Budget of the ADC has to be passed by the majority votes by the Council in session. The other duties of the Council in session are to legislate and enact laws and regulations on such powers as conferred by the Sixth Schedule. Bills on laws and regulations passed by the Council in session are sent to the Governor of the State for his assent or approval.

To run the affairs of the Legislative Secretariat, the Council in session elects a Chairman and Deputy Chairman whose duties are similar to the speaker and the Deputy Speaker of the State Legislature. The Office of the Legislative is looked after by officers and staff headed by the Secretary Legislative.

2022 Elections 
BJP swept the election by winning all 26 seat of the Council. Tuliram Ronghang is appointed as Chief Executive of the council.

See also
 Karbi Anglong district
 West Karbi Anglong district
 Autonomous administrative divisions of India
 Hill tribes of Northeast India
 North Eastern Council

References

External links
Karbi Anglong Autonomous Council

Autonomous district councils of India
Local government in Assam
1951 establishments in Assam